Koge Station may refer to:

 Køge station, a railway station in Køge, Denmark
 Kōge Station, a railway station in Tottori Prefecture, Japan

See also
 Køge Nord Station, in Køge, Denmark
 Higashi-Kōge Station, in Yazu, Tottori Prefecture, Japan